Mount Hopkins is located in the Southern Alps of New Zealand's South Island. Several rivers have their sources on or close to the slopes of Mount Hopkins, notably the Landsborough River to the west, the Dobson River to the east, and Hopkins River to the south. At Mount Hopkins, the traditional boundaries of the former Otago, Westland, and Canterbury Provinces meet, these boundaries survive today as provincial districts, and only serve for the purposes of determining anniversary days. However, the modern day boundaries of the Otago region, the West Coast region and the Canterbury region meet further south at Mt Strauchon, which is also on the Main Divide.

References

Mountains of Otago
Westland District
Mountains of Canterbury, New Zealand
Southern Alps